Gary N. Click (born December 29, 1965) is an American politician, the Ohio state representative from its 88th district. He won the seat in 2020, after incumbent Republican Bill Reineke left it to run for the Ohio Senate, defeating Democrat Chris Liebold 62.9% to 37.1%.

Election history

References

External links
Official website
Official campaign website

Living people
Republican Party members of the Ohio House of Representatives
21st-century American politicians
People from Sandusky County, Ohio
1965 births